Belmont Swansea United Football Club, more commonly known as "Belswans" is a semi-professional football club based in Blacksmiths in the Hunter Region, New South Wales. Belmont Swansea United currently competes in the Northern NSW State League Division 1 with teams in First Grade, Reserve Grade, Under 18s, Under 16s, Under 15s, Under 14s and Under 13s.

The Northern NSW State League Division 1 is the second tier of football in Northern NSW Football below the National Premier Leagues Northern NSW.

Belswans are the 2019 major premiers of the Northern NSW State League Division 1, winning the Grand Final 3–2 against Cooks Hill. They also won the 2018 Grand Final, with a 4–2 win over West Wallsend. They also made Grand Finals in 2016 and 2017.

On 27th October 2020, the Belswans announced via social media that they had signed André Gumprecht, a former professional of Germany's top divisions, National Soccer League, A-League and others, as their head coach, with Mick Stafford stepping back into an assistant role.

Gumprecht mutually parted from the club before the end of the 2021 season, with Stafford resuming the role as head coach for 2022.

History
The club was founded in 1935 under the name Blacksmiths Rangers. In 1956, the name was changed to Belmont Swansea United Soccer Club to represent a wider area. In 2015 the name was changed in line with Football Federation Australia policy to Belmont Swansea United Football Club.

On 27th October 2020, the Belswans announced via social media that they had signed André Gumprecht, a former professional of Germany's top divisions, National Soccer League, A-League and others, as their head coach, with Mick Stafford stepping back into an assistant role. During the 2021 season, Andre led the club on a quality FFA Cup run, in which they beat Toronto Awaba Stags FC 7–3, Wallsend F.C. 8–1, and National Premier Leagues Northern NSW side Adamstown Rosebud FC 4–1, before losing in round 6 of qualifying 1–0 to Weston Bears FC.

First Grade Squad 

 

*Accurate as of July 4 2021

Top Goal-scorers Per Season

Coaching Staff

Honours
* Accurate from 2012 onwards

1st Grade
Minor Premierships: 

Grand Finals: 2018 Northern NSW State League Division 1, 2019 Northern NSW State League Division 1

Reserve Grade/U23s
Minor Premierships: 

Grand Finals:

U18s/U19s
Minor Premierships: 

Grand Finals: 2016 Northern NSW State League Division 1

Youth
Minor Premierships: 2020 Northern NSW State League Division 1 (U14s)

Grand Finals: 2020 Northern NSW State League Division 1 (U15s)

References

External links
 Northern NSW Football
 Belmont Swansea Utd Soccer Club

1935 establishments in Australia
Association football clubs established in 1935
Soccer clubs in Newcastle, New South Wales